Short course swimming, for the 2013 Asian Indoor and Martial Arts Games, was held at the Dowon Aquatics Center. It took place from 30 June to 3 July 2013.

Medalists

Men

Women

Medal table

Results

Men

50 m freestyle
30 June

 Guntur Pratama Putera of Indonesia originally finished 14th, but was disqualified after he tested positive for Methylhexanamine.

100 m freestyle
3 July

200 m freestyle
2 July

50 m backstroke
1 July

100 m backstroke
2 July

50 m breaststroke
1 July

 Indra Gunawan of Indonesia originally won the gold medal, but was disqualified after he tested positive for Methylhexanamine.

100 m breaststroke
30 June

 Indra Gunawan of Indonesia originally finished 6th, but was disqualified after he tested positive for Methylhexanamine.

50 m butterfly
2 July

 Guntur Pratama Putera of Indonesia originally finished 11th, but was disqualified after he tested positive for Methylhexanamine.

100 m butterfly
1 July

100 m individual medley
3 July

200 m individual medley
30 June

4 × 50 m freestyle relay
2 July

 Indonesia originally won the silver medal, but was disqualified after Guntur Pratama Putera tested positive for Methylhexanamine.

4 × 100 m freestyle relay
1 July

 Indonesia originally won the bronze medal, but was disqualified after Guntur Pratama Putera tested positive for Methylhexanamine.

4 × 50 m medley relay
30 June

 Indonesia originally finished 4th, but was disqualified after Indra Gunawan tested positive for Methylhexanamine.

4 × 100 m medley relay
3 July

 Indonesia disqualified after Indra Gunawan tested positive for Methylhexanamine.

Women

50 m freestyle
30 June

100 m freestyle
3 July

200 m freestyle
2 July

50 m backstroke
1 July

100 m backstroke
2 July

50 m breaststroke
3 July

100 m breaststroke
30 June

50 m butterfly
2 July

100 m butterfly
1 July

100 m individual medley
3 July

200 m individual medley
30 June

4 × 50 m freestyle relay
2 July

4 × 100 m freestyle relay
1 July

4 × 50 m medley relay
30 June

4 × 100 m medley relay
3 July

References

2013 Asian Indoor and Martial Arts Games events
Asian Indoor Games
2013
2013 Asian Indoor Games
International aquatics competitions hosted by South Korea